The OFC U-20 Championship 1992 was held in Papeete, Tahiti. It also served as qualification for the intercontinental play-off for the 1993 FIFA World Youth Championship.

Teams
The following teams entered the tournament:

 
 
 
  (host)

Matches

Qualification to World Youth Championship
  (host)

New Zealand failed to qualify for the 1993 FIFA World Youth Championship. They lost four matches in an intercontinental play-off to South Korea, Thailand, Saudi Arabia and Qatar (respectively 1–5, 0–2, 1–3 and 0–3). These matches were played in Dubai, Qatar in September and October, 1992.

References

External links
Results by RSSSF

Beach
OFC U-20 Championship
Under 20
1992
1992 in youth association football